Michael Dean Roland is an American musician and songwriter. He is best known for being the rhythm guitarist of the band Collective Soul, an alternative rock band fronted by his brother Ed. He is also part of the rock duo Magnets & Ghosts alongside Ryan Potesta.

Discography
 With Collective Soul
 Hints, Allegations, and Things Left Unsaid (1994)
 Collective Soul (Blue Album) (1995)
 Disciplined Breakdown (1997)
 Dosage (1999)
 Blender (2000)
 Youth (2004)
 From the Ground Up (2005)
 Home (2006)
 Afterwords (2008)
 Collective Soul (The Rabbit) (2009)
 See What You Started By Continuing (2015)
 Live (2017)
 Blood (2019)
 Half & Half (2020)
 Vibrating (2022)
 With Magnets & Ghosts
 Mass (2011)
 Be Born (2014)
 Space Time Gender (2018)

References

External links
Official Collective Soul website
Official Magnets & Ghosts website

20th-century American musicians
21st-century American musicians
Alternative rock guitarists
Alternative rock singers
American alternative rock musicians
American male singers
American rock singers
Collective Soul members
Ed Roland
Living people
Musicians from Atlanta
People from Stockbridge, Georgia
Rhythm guitarists
Songwriters from Georgia (U.S. state)
Guitarists from Georgia (U.S. state)
American male guitarists
21st-century American singers
Year of birth missing (living people)